The 26th Edition Vuelta a España (Tour of Spain), a long-distance bicycle stage race and one of the three grand tours, was held from 29 April to 16 May 1971. Joop Zoetemelk won the mountains classification while Cyrille Guimard won the points classification.

After the final stage, Wim Schepers was ranked in second place, 19 seconds behind Bracke, but he was given a ten-minute time penalty for a doping offence, and dropped to 15th.

Teams and riders

Route

Results

Final General Classification

References

 
1971 in road cycling
1971
1971 in Spanish sport
1971 Super Prestige Pernod